Hanwen may refer to:
Classical Chinese (sometimes  )

Hanwen is also the Mandarin pinyin transcription of various Chinese given names (e.g.). People with these names include:
Edmond Leung (born 1971), Hong Kong singer-songwriter
Deng Hanwen (born 1995), Chinese football defender
Wee Han Wen, Malaysian local politician in Miri, Sarawak
Han-Wen Nienhuys, Dutch software developer